Ken or Kenneth Reeves may refer to:

Ken Reeves (American football) (born 1961), offensive tackle for six seasons in NFL
Ken Reeves (basketball), drafted in 1950 Boston Celtics draft history
Kenneth Reeves (born 1951), former mayor of Cambridge, Massachusetts
Ken Reeves (meteorologist) (1961–2012), meteorologist for AccuWeather